KKOA (107.7 FM) is a radio station broadcasting a country music format. Licensed to Volcano, Hawaii, United States, the station serves the Hilo area. The station is currently owned by Resonate Broadcasting through licensee Resoante Hawaii LLC, and features programming from ABC Radio's "Today's Best Country" satellite feed.

References

External links

KOA
Radio stations established in 1979
1979 establishments in Hawaii